Celebrity Equinox is a  built by Meyer Werft in Germany. Celebrity Equinox is the second of the five Solstice-class vessels, owned and operated by Celebrity Cruises. Celebrity Equinox entered commercial service for Celebrity Cruises on July 31, 2009. 

Kate McCue was captain of the Celebrity Equinox until August 2019, and the first American woman to be captain of a "mega" cruise ship.

Facilities 

The vessel includes a theater and a lawn made up of real grass between the ship's funnels where croquet can be played.

Celebrity Equinox was refitted in May 2019.

Itineraries 
Currently the Celebrity Equinox sails to the Caribbean and the Bahamas year-round from its homeport at Fort Lauderdale, Florida.

Post Covid comeback 
Celebriy Equinox sailed from Fort Lauderdale to the Caribbean on July 25, 2021 ending a year long halt in cruising.

References

External links 

Official website
Meyer Werft Website

Ships built in Papenburg
Equinox
2009 ships